Valena Valentina is an Indian Karate player from Bhubaneswar, Odisha.

Early life and education 
She is the daughter of Radha Raman Mohanty, national level arms wrestler and footballer. She is a graduate from Rama Devi Women's University, Bhubaneswar.

Career 
She is a national gold winning karateka at the Karate Association India Championships and the AIKF National Championships. She has won gold medals at the South Asian Karate Championships at Colombo in 2017, Delhi in 2014 and two gold medals at Delhi in 2011.

At the 2010 Asian Games, Valentina reached the bronze medal match in 50 kg category and finished 4th.

Valentina won silver medal in the 45 kg category at the 2010 South Asian Games.

References

External links
Valena Valentina

1988 births
Living people
Sportspeople from Bhubaneswar
Indian female karateka
Indian female martial artists
Martial artists from Odisha
Sportswomen from Odisha
Karateka at the 2010 Asian Games
Asian Games competitors for India
South Asian Games silver medalists for India
South Asian Games medalists in karate
21st-century Indian women
21st-century Indian people